Vasantham is a Singapore Indian language (predominantly Tamil) entertainment free-to-view commercial broadcast television network owned by the Mediacorp, a subsidiary of Government of Singapore's Sovereign wealth fund, Temasek Holdings.The following is a list of all television programming that Mediacorp Vasantham has broadcast since it began as a standalone Tamil channel on 19 October 2008.

Current programming

Dramas
Kannum Kannum Kolaiyadithaal கண்ணும் கண்ணும் கொள்ளையடித்தால்
 Bayam பயம்
 Nyabagam Varuthe
 Manmadhan Ambu மன்மதன் அம்பு

Weekly shows / soap opera's / movie slots

Weekly shows
Rayil Sneham (Mondays; season 4)
 Music Junction (Tuesdays; season 1)
 Ethiroli (Wednesdays; season 15) 
 Neeyum Naanum (Wednesdays; season 1)
 Nerukku Naer (Thursdays; season 2)
 My Dear Kudumbam Returns (Fridays; season 4)

Soap opera's
 Priyasaki
 Mella Thirandhathu Kadhavu Season 2
 Multiple language serials
 Telugu Series: Monday To Tuesday at 7.30 PM
 Hindi Series: Wednesday and Thursday at 7.30 PM
 Malayalam Series: Friday at 6:00 PM

Movies
There are 7 movie slots per week.
 Bollywood Masti – films from the Bollywood film industry; its main block slogan is "Enjoy Discreetly"
 Cinema Express – encore movie slot featuring Kollywood movies
 Indian Panorama– featuring regional movies from India; includes Telugu, Marathi, Malayalam, Kannada and Punjabi movies
 Tamil Silver Screen– the latest films from the Kollywood film industry
 Tamil Talkies - films of the 90s and early 2000s from the Kollywood film industry
 Vasantham Box Office – movies from the 70s to the 80s of the Kollywood film industry
 Vasantham Gold - older Kollywood films

News and information
 Vasantham Tamil Seithi - The channel's main news in Tamil is shown at 8:30 pm daily and repeats at 11:30 pm from Monday to Wednesday so Thursday, Friday and weekends at the time for the repeat telecast and broadcasts before closedown.
 Anthanaal Nyabagam (2016) -An info-ed programme to educate and inform vasantham viewers the rich history of Tamil Television in Singapore. This would bring back our yesteryear artiste on screen and recollect their contributions and achievement for Singapore Tamil television.
 All Access Changi-Changiyin Ulle

Awards shows / beauty pageants
 *Pradhana Vizha

Reality/non-scripted/Musical Show
 Nenjukelle-Nenjukulle is an unplugged music variety show that will feature a live band and a guest celebrity who will share with us their favorite songs.
 Thedral-Star Search 2016 
 Thirai Talkies- This program will include the glitz, glamour, gossips, information that has never been told about Tamil cinema

 Anjarai Petti (The Cooking Show From Zee Tamil, Weekdays at 3:00 PM)
 Super Samayal (The Cooking Show From Star Vijay, Weekdays at 3:30 PM)

Former programming

Drama series

Monday to Thursday (7.30Pm)

Monday to Thursday (7.30Pm)

Wednesday (7.30Pm)

Friday (7.30Pm)

Other dramas

References

Mediacorp Vasantham
Mediacorp
programs
Mediacorp Vasantham
Mediacorp Vasantham